The Government of Colombia is a republic with separation of powers into executive, judicial and legislative branches. 
Its legislature has a congress,
its judiciary has a supreme court, and
its executive branch has a president.
 
The citizens of Colombia cast votes concerning their government, and they employ a public sector office for an inspector general to oversee the public interface of the government.  This safeguards the public, and guarantees the human rights spelled out in the Constitution of 1991, which provides the framework for a welfare state and a unitary republic.

Colombia has "control institutions" that mix government and public officials, who work alongside one another. For example, the public's inspector general works closely with the government's controller general, whose job it is to ensure governmental fiscal responsibility. An independent Ombudsman deals with maladministration complaints and functions.

Executive

The executive branch of power in Colombia is headed by the President of the Republic. He is supported by the Vice President of Colombia, the Council of Ministers and Government entities of Colombia| Administrative Departments of Colombia. The government is in charge of creating and developing policies concerning Colombia, while the governors of the Departments of Colombia are elected by popular vote to represent the president and the executive branch of government. 
Mayors are subordinated to the governors, who are the maximum representatives of the executive branch of government at a municipal level. Mayors are also elected in regional elections, along with the department governors.

In 2015,  Colombia's Congress limited presidency to single term, preventing the president from seeking re-election.

Legislative
The legislative branch is the branch that makes laws. Representatives are elected by the people and support their thoughts in government.

Judiciary

The judiciary of Colombia (Spanish: Rama Judicial de Colombia) is a branch of the State of Colombia that interprets and applies the laws of Colombia, to ensure equal justice under law, and to provide a mechanism for dispute resolution. The judiciary comprises a hierarchical system of courts presided over by judges, magistrates and other adjudicators.

Colombia is a centralized state, thus there is only one jurisdiction (with the exception of special indigenous jurisdictions), which is functionally divided by subject matter into an ordinary, penal, administrative, disciplinary, constitutional and special jurisdictions (military, peace, and indigenous matters).

References

External links 

  Government of Colombia